Veselí nad Moravou is a town in the South Moravian Region of the Czech Republic. It has about 11,000 inhabitants. The historic town centre is well preserved and is protected by law as an urban monument zone.

Administrative parts
Town parts of Milokošť and Zarazice are administrative parts of Veselí nad Moravou.

Geography

The town lies on the Morava river. Part of the Baťa Canal runs along the river.

The western part of the municipal territory is located in the Lower Morava Valley and the eastern part in the Vizovice Highlands.

History
The first written mention of Veselí nad Moravou is from 1261, when a water castle with a settlement existed here. In 1397, a town that took the name Veselí was founded. The original settlement developed separately and was known as Předměstí Veselí (i.e. "Veselí Suburb").

In 1526, Veselí was acquired by Hynek Bilík of Kornice who had the castle rebuilt into a Renaissance residence. In the Thirty Years' War, Veselí and Předměstí Veselí were burned down several times, and the castle was looted. The Chorinský family, who bought the Veselí estate in 1731, had rebuilt the castle to its current Neoclassical form in 1834–1840.

In 1886, the town of Veselí was renamed Veselí nad Moravou. In 1887 and 1888, the railway to Brno and to Rohatec was built. In 1919, Veselí nad Moravou, Předměstí Veselí, and until then independent Jewish community merged into one whole. In 1950, Zarazice was joined to the town, and in 1964, Milokošť was joined. Both originally independent municipalities urbanistically fused with the town.

Demographics

Sights

The Veselí nad Moravou Castle was damaged in the World War II and by subsequent insensitive use. It is gradually repaired and is not accessible to the public. Its part is a large castle park with a set of ponds, which is freely accessible. In the park is a castle administration building from around 1800.

The historic centre is located on an island in the Morava river. It consists of the Bartolomějské Square with the Church of Saint Bartholomew, built from 1733 to 1741, and with the Town Museum.

The former Servite monastery with the Church of the Holy Guardian Angels is a significant baroque monument from the 18th century. The monastery was founded in 1714 and abolished in 1784. The construction of the church was finished in 1764. Part of the monastery buildings serves today as the town hall.

The Church of the Virgin Mary is the oldest church in Veselí. It was first mentioned in 1360. Preserved Romanesque-Gothic elements indicate that it was built in the late 13th century.

Panský dvůr ("Manor house") was originally a complex of farm buildings and large granary, built in 1646. The only preserved house served as an administrative building and today houses the regional tourist information centre, a small museum, a gallery, and cultural spaces.

Notable people
Fred Sersen (1890–1962), painter and cinema special effects artist
Karel Benedík (1923–1997), painter; died here
Milan Puzrla (1946–2021), cyclist

Twin towns – sister cities

Veselí nad Moravou is twinned with:
 Crespellano (Valsamoggia), Italy
 Malacky, Slovakia
 Żnin, Poland

References

External links

Populated places in Hodonín District
Cities and towns in the Czech Republic
Moravian Slovakia